Graduados is a 2013 Colombian telenovela, a remake of the Argentine telenovela Graduados. It starred Luis Fernando Hoyos, Kathy Sáenz, Jorge Enrique Abello, Santiago Moure, Zharick León and Diana Ángel.

Plot
The first episode takes place in a graduation night, in 1993. María Laura Vallejo (Kathy Saenz), the girlfriend of the school bully Pablo Urrutia (Jorge Enrique Abello), left him when he cheated on her. Andrés Torres (Luis Fernando Hoyos) drives her out of the school premises and had sex with her. She got pregnant, and got married with Pablo, as she thought that he was the father of her boy.

After a time skip of 20 years, Andrés meets María Laura again, and they discover that her son Martín (Juan Pablo Urrego) was actually the son of Andrés and not Pablo.

Reception
The original telenovela Graduados was a huge success in Argentina, so RCN Televisión bought the rights to make a Colombian remake, expecting a similar success. However, the series had a poor reception. Ómar Rincon, from the newspaper "El Tiempo", attributed it to the poor actor performances, a failure to capture the feeling of the eighties, plot references to the Argentine society which were not properly modified to reference the Colombian one, and a failure to use the music as a plot element, rather than as a mere background. The Colombian writer Cecilia Percy pointed as well that there are few previous attempts in Colombia to produce remakes, and that they usually generated poor received works even when the original one was a success.

Cast
 Kathy Sáenz as Laura "Lali" Vallejo 
 Luis Fernando Hoyos as Andrés "Andy" Torres Castro 
 Jorge Enrique Abello as Pablo Urrutia "Pablardo" -" footloser" 
 Zharick León as Jimena Rocha/Patricia Delgado  Santiago Moure as "Chicho" 
 Diana Ángel as Verónica "Vero" Paz 
 Luis Eduardo Arango as Clemente Vallejo "Don Bacan"  Fernando Arévalo as Elías Torres  Carla Giraldo as Gabriela "Gaby" Torres Castro  Luces Velásquez as Nubia Castro de Torres 
 Victoria Góngora as Victoria "Vicky" Pombo 
 Carlos Manuel Vesga as Guillermo "Guille" Aldana 
 Juan Pablo Urrego as Martín Urrutia "Martincho"  Álvaro Bayona as Walter 
 Luz Estrada as "Clarita" 
 Verónica Orozco as Teresa 
 Andrés Toro as Augusto Echeverria 
 Diana Neira as Sofía Duarte 
 Karla Ramírez as Inés Duarte  Lucas Buelvas as Juancho  Cristina Umaña as Sandra "kasandra" Mendez 
 Jim Munoz as Lucas 
 Bernardo Garcia as Mario 
 Orlando Lamboglia as  "Currulao" 
 Consuelo Luzardo as Profesora Quiñonez "Riñones"  
 Marcelo Dos Santos as Dany Torres 
 Lina Tejeiro as Luna 
 Alejandro López as Gustavo 
 Lorna Paz as Juana 
 Luis Fernando Bohorquez as Fernando

References

External links
 Official site 

2013 telenovelas
2013 Colombian television series debuts
2014 Colombian television series endings